Ruawaro is a rural community in the Waikato District and Waikato region of New Zealand's North Island, situated south of Lake Whangape and west of Huntly.

The location of the 1933 Lakey murders and the childhood home of Topp Twins are both located in the area.

Ruawaro's Central Memorial Hall is a brick hall opened in 1953, built as a Second World War memorial for the small mining and farming settlements of Rotongaro, Ruawaro, Pukekapia and Waikokowai. It features a wooden table commemorating those who served, and a bronze plaque commemorating the eight local men were killed in action during the war.

As of 2017, Puketotara Station, a local intensive beef and lamb finishing farm, is owned by an equity firm.

History

Lakey murders

Ruawaro attracted national media attention when local couple Samuel and Christobel Lakey were murdered on their Ruawaro farm on Sunday 15 October 1933. Christobel's body was found by neighbours who were investigating why the couple's cows hadn't been milked.

An intensive and high-profile homicide investigation using ground-breaking forensic science led to neighbour William Alfred Bayly being convicted and hanged for the crime.

Bayly had been farming in Ruawaro since November 1928. To some locals, he was a "handsome dare-devil fellow" with a "magnetic" personality. To others, he was a scary and arrogant man who rode around the area on his horse.

Samuel Lakey had purchased the neighbouring property from Bayly's father, who he had worked for as a carpenter. Relations were initially friendly, but soured when Christobel Lakey was said to have accused Bayly of having murdered his niece.

Samuel Lakey's remains were finally reunited with this wife's remains at Huntly Cemetery at a ceremony in 2015, attended by the granddaughter of one of the neighbours.

Topp Twins

The Topp Twins were raised on a local dairy farm and attended Ruawaro Combined School during the 1960s and early 1970s. They left home and moved to Christchurch in 1975, at the age of 17. Staff and students at the school compiled memorabilia from their time at the school when they returned during the 1990s.

The Topp Twins: Untouchable Girls, a 2009 documentary feature film about the sisters directed by Leanne Pooley, covers their often difficult childhood in the deeply conservative rural community. The film screened at film festivals around the world, and won awards at the Toronto International Film Festival, Melbourne International Film Festival, Göteborg International Film Festival, Portland International Film Festival and the 2009 New Zealand Film and Television Awards.

Education 

References 

Waikato District
Populated places in Waikato